Josef Rudolf Mengele (16 March 19117 February 1979), also known as the Angel of Death, was a German  (SS) officer and physician during World War II. He performed deadly experiments on prisoners at the Auschwitz II (Birkenau) concentration camp, where he was a member of the team of doctors who selected victims to be killed in the gas chambers, and was one of the doctors who administered the gas.

Before the war, Mengele received doctorates in anthropology and medicine, and began a career as a researcher. He joined the Nazi Party in 1937 and the SS in 1938. He was assigned as a battalion medical officer at the start of World War II, then transferred to the Nazi concentration camps service in early 1943 and assigned to Auschwitz, where he saw the opportunity to conduct genetic research on human subjects. His experiments focused primarily on twins, with no regard for the health or safety of the victims. With Red Army troops sweeping through German-occupied Poland, Mengele was transferred  from Auschwitz to the Gross-Rosen concentration camp on 17 January 1945, ten days before the arrival of the Soviet forces at Auschwitz.

After the war, Mengele fled to Argentina in July 1949, assisted by a network of former SS members. He initially lived in and around Buenos Aires, then fled to Paraguay in 1959 and Brazil in 1960, all while being sought by West Germany, Israel, and Nazi hunters such as Simon Wiesenthal, who wanted to bring him to trial. Mengele eluded capture in spite of extradition requests by the West German government and clandestine operations by the Israeli intelligence agency Mossad. He drowned in 1979 after suffering a stroke while swimming off the coast of Bertioga, and was buried under the false name of Wolfgang Gerhard. His remains were disinterred and positively identified by forensic examination in 1985.

Early life
Mengele was born into a Catholic family in Günzburg, Bavaria on 16 March 1911, the eldest of three sons of Walburga ( Hupfauer) and Karl Mengele. His two younger brothers were Karl Jr. and Alois. Their father was founder of the Karl Mengele & Sons company (later renamed as ), which produced farming machinery. Mengele was successful at school and developed an interest in music, art, and skiing. He completed high school in April 1930 and went on to study philosophy in Munich, where the headquarters of the Nazi Party were located. He attended the University of Bonn, where he took his medical preliminary examination. In 1931 he joined , a paramilitary organization that was absorbed into the Nazi  ('Storm Detachment'; SA) in 1934. In 1935, Mengele earned a PhD in anthropology from the University of Munich. In January 1937, he joined the Institute for Hereditary Biology and Racial Hygiene in Frankfurt, where he worked for Otmar Freiherr von Verschuer, a German geneticist with a particular interest in researching twins.

As Von Verschuer's assistant, Mengele focused on the genetic factors that result in a cleft lip and palate, or a cleft chin. His thesis on the subject earned him a  doctorate in medicine (MD) from the University of Frankfurt in 1938. (Both of his degrees were revoked by the issuing universities in the 1960s.) In a letter of recommendation, Von Verschuer praised Mengele's reliability and his ability to verbally present complex material in a clear manner. The American author Robert Jay Lifton notes that Mengele's published works were in keeping with the scientific mainstream of the time, and would probably have been viewed as valid scientific efforts even outside Nazi Germany.

On 28 July 1939, Mengele married Irene Schönbein, whom he had met while working as a medical resident in Leipzig. Their only son, Rolf, was born in 1944.

Military service
The ideology of Nazism brought together elements of antisemitism, racial hygiene, and eugenics, and combined them with pan-Germanism and territorial expansionism with the goal of obtaining more  (living space) for the Germanic people. Nazi Germany attempted to obtain this new territory by attacking Poland and the Soviet Union, intending to deport or kill the Jews and Slavs living there, who were considered by the Nazis to be inferior to the Aryan master race.

In June 1941, Mengele was posted to Ukraine, where he was awarded the Iron Cross 2nd Class. In January 1942, he joined the 5th SS Panzer Division Wiking as a battalion medical officer. After rescuing two German soldiers from a burning tank, he was decorated with the Iron Cross 1st Class, the Wound Badge in Black, and the Medal for the Care of the German People. He was declared unfit for further active service in mid-1942, when he was seriously wounded in action near Rostov-on-Don. Following his recovery, he was transferred to the headquarters of the SS Race and Settlement Main Office in Berlin, at which point he resumed his association with Von Verschuer, who was now director of the Kaiser Wilhelm Institute of Anthropology, Human Heredity, and Eugenics. Mengele was promoted to the rank of SS- ('captain') in April 1943.

Auschwitz

In 1942, Auschwitz II (Birkenau), originally intended to house slave laborers, began to be used instead as a combined labour camp and extermination camp. Prisoners were transported there by rail from all over Nazi-controlled Europe, arriving in daily convoys. By July 1942, SS doctors were conducting "selections" where incoming Jews were segregated, and those considered able to work were admitted into the camp while those deemed unfit for labor were immediately killed in the gas chambers. The arrivals that were selected to die, about three-quarters of the total, included almost all children, women with small children, pregnant women, all the elderly, and all of those who appeared (in a brief and superficial inspection by an SS doctor) to be not completely fit and healthy.

In early 1943, Von Verschuer encouraged Mengele to apply for a transfer to the concentration camp service. The SS doctors did not administer treatment to the Auschwitz inmates but supervised the activities of inmate doctors who had been forced to work in the camp medical service. As part of his duties, Mengele made weekly visits to the hospital barracks and ordered any prisoners who had not recovered after two weeks in bed to be sent to the gas chambers.

Mengele's work also involved carrying out selections, a task that he chose to perform even when he was not assigned to do so, in the hope of finding subjects for his experiments, with a particular interest in locating sets of twins. In contrast to most of the other SS doctors, who viewed selections as one of their most stressful and unpleasant duties, he undertook the task with a flamboyant air, often smiling or whistling. He was one of the SS doctors responsible for supervising the administration of Zyklon B, the cyanide-based pesticide that was used for the mass killings in the Birkenau gas chambers. He served in this capacity at the gas chambers located in crematoria IV and V.

When an outbreak of noma—a gangrenous bacterial disease of the mouth and face—struck the Romani camp in 1943, Mengele initiated a study to determine the cause of the disease and develop a treatment. He enlisted the assistance of prisoner Berthold Epstein, a Jewish pediatrician and professor at Prague University. The patients were isolated in separate barracks and several afflicted children were killed so that their preserved heads and organs could be sent to the SS Medical Academy in Graz and other facilities for study. This research was still ongoing when the Romani camp was liquidated and its remaining occupants killed in 1944.

When a typhus epidemic began in the women's camp, Mengele cleared one block of six hundred Jewish women and sent them to their deaths in the gas chambers. The building was then cleaned and disinfected and the occupants of a neighboring block were bathed, de–loused, and given new clothing before being moved into the clean block. This process was repeated until all of the barracks were disinfected. Similar procedures were used for later epidemics of scarlet fever and other diseases, with infected prisoners being killed in the gas chambers. For these actions, Mengele was awarded the War Merit Cross (Second Class with swords) and was promoted in 1944 to First Physician of the Birkenau subcamp.

Human experimentation

Mengele used Auschwitz as an opportunity to continue his anthropological studies and research into heredity, using inmates for human experimentation. His medical procedures showed no consideration for the victims' health, safety, or physical and emotional suffering. He was particularly interested in identical twins, people with heterochromia iridum (eyes of two different colors), dwarfs, and people with physical abnormalities. The grant was used to build a pathology laboratory attached to Crematorium II at Auschwitz II-Birkenau. Miklós Nyiszli, a Hungarian Jewish pathologist who arrived in Auschwitz on 29 May 1944, performed dissections and prepared specimens for shipment in this laboratory. The twin research was in part intended to prove the supremacy of heredity over the environment in determining phenotypes and thus strengthen the Nazi premise of the genetic superiority of the Aryan race. Nyiszli and others reported that the twin studies may also have been motivated by an intention to uncover strategies for 'racially desirable' Germans to reproduce more twins.

Mengele's research subjects were better fed and housed than the other prisoners, and temporarily spared from execution in the gas chambers. His research subjects lived in their own barracks, where they were provided with a marginally better quality of food and somewhat improved living conditions than the other areas of the camp. When visiting his young subjects, he introduced himself as "Uncle Mengele" and offered them sweets, while at the same time being personally responsible for the deaths of an unknown number of victims whom he killed via lethal injection, shootings, beatings, and his deadly experiments. In his 1986 book, Lifton describes Mengele as sadistic, lacking empathy, and extremely antisemitic, believing the Jews should be eliminated as an inferior and dangerous race. Rolf Mengele later claimed that his father had shown no remorse for his wartime activities.

A former Auschwitz inmate doctor said of Mengele:

Twins were subjected to weekly examinations and measurements of their physical attributes by Mengele or one of his assistants. The experiments he performed on twins included unnecessary amputation of limbs, intentionally infecting one twin with typhus or some other disease, and transfusing the blood of one twin into the other. Many of the victims died while undergoing these procedures, and those who survived the experiments were sometimes killed and their bodies dissected once Mengele had no further use for them. Nyiszli recalled one occasion on which Mengele personally killed fourteen twins in one night by injecting their hearts with chloroform. If one twin died from disease, he would kill the other twin to allow comparative post-mortem reports to be produced for research purposes.

Mengele's eye experiments included attempts to change the eye color by injecting chemicals into the eyes of living subjects, and he killed people with heterochromatic eyes so that the eyes could be removed and sent to Berlin for study. His experiments on dwarfs and people with physical abnormalities included taking physical measurements, drawing blood, extracting healthy teeth, and treatment with unnecessary drugs and X-rays. Many of his victims were dispatched to the gas chambers after about two weeks, and their skeletons were sent to Berlin for further analysis. Mengele sought out pregnant women, on whom he would perform experiments before sending them to the gas chambers. Alex Dekel, a survivor, reports witnessing Mengele performing vivisection without anesthesia, removing hearts and stomachs of victims. Yitzhak Ganon, another survivor, reported in 2009 how Mengele removed his kidney without anesthesia. He was forced to return to work without painkillers. Witness Vera Alexander described how Mengele sewed two Romani twins together, back to back, in a crude attempt to create conjoined twins; both children died of gangrene after several days of suffering.

After Auschwitz

Along with several other Auschwitz doctors, Mengele transferred to Gross-Rosen concentration camp in Lower Silesia on 17 January 1945, taking with him two boxes of specimens and the records of his experiments at Auschwitz. Most of the camp medical records had already been destroyed by the SS by the time the Red Army liberated Auschwitz on 27 January. Mengele fled Gross-Rosen on 18 February, a week before the Soviets arrived there, and traveled westward to Žatec in Czechoslovakia, disguised as a  officer. There he temporarily entrusted his incriminating documents to a nurse with whom he had struck up a relationship. He and his unit then hurried west to avoid being captured by the Soviets, but were taken prisoners of war by the Americans in June 1945. Although Mengele was initially registered under his own name, he was not identified as being on the major war criminal list due to the disorganization of the Allies regarding the distribution of wanted lists, and the fact that he did not have the usual SS blood group tattoo. He was released at the end of July and obtained false papers under the name "Fritz Ulmann", documents he later altered to read "Fritz Hollmann".

After several months on the run, including a trip back to the Soviet-occupied area to recover his Auschwitz records, Mengele found work near Rosenheim as a farmhand. He eventually escaped from Germany on 17 April 1949, convinced that his capture would mean a trial and death sentence. Assisted by a network of former SS members, he used the ratline to travel to Genoa, where he obtained a passport from the International Committee of the Red Cross under the alias "Helmut Gregor", and sailed to Argentina in July 1949. His wife refused to accompany him, and they divorced in 1954.

In South America
Mengele worked as a carpenter in Buenos Aires, Argentina, while lodging in a boarding house in the suburb of Vicente López. After a few weeks, he moved to the house of a Nazi sympathizer in the more affluent neighborhood of Florida Este. He next worked as a salesman for his family's farm equipment company, Karl Mengele & Sons, and in 1951 he began making frequent trips to Paraguay as a regional sales representative. He moved into an apartment in central Buenos Aires in 1953, used family funds to buy a part interest in a carpentry concern, and then rented a house in the suburb of Olivos in 1954. Files released by the Argentine government in 1992 indicate that Mengele may have practiced medicine without a license while living in Buenos Aires, including performing abortions.

After obtaining a copy of his birth certificate through the West German embassy in 1956, Mengele was issued an Argentine foreign residence permit under his real name. He used this document to obtain a West German passport using his real name and embarked on a trip to Europe. He met with his son Rolf (who was told Mengele was his "Uncle Fritz") and his widowed sister-in-law Martha, for a ski holiday in Switzerland; he also spent a week in his home town of Günzburg. When he returned to Argentina in September 1956, Mengele began living under his real name. Martha and her son Karl Heinz followed about a month later, and the three began living together. Josef and Martha were married in 1958 while on holiday in Uruguay, and they bought a house in Buenos Aires. Mengele's business interests now included part ownership of Fadro Farm, a pharmaceutical company. Along with several other doctors, he was questioned in 1958 on suspicion of practicing medicine without a license when a teenage girl died after an abortion, but he was released without charge. Aware that the publicity could lead to his Nazi background and wartime activities being discovered, he took an extended business trip to Paraguay and was granted citizenship there in 1959 under the name "José Mengele". He returned to Buenos Aires several times to settle his business affairs and visit his family. Martha and Karl lived in a boarding house in the city until December 1960, when they returned to West Germany.

Mengele's name was mentioned several times during the Nuremberg trials in the mid-1940s, but the Allied forces believed that he was probably already dead. Irene Mengele and the family in Günzburg also alleged that he had died. Working in West Germany, Nazi hunters Simon Wiesenthal and Hermann Langbein collected information from witnesses about Mengele's wartime activities. In a search of the public records, Langbein discovered Mengele's divorce papers, which listed an address in Buenos Aires. He and Wiesenthal pressured the West German authorities into starting extradition proceedings, and an arrest warrant was drawn up on 5 June 1959. Argentina initially refused the extradition request because the fugitive was no longer living at the address given on the documents; by the time extradition was approved on 30 June, Mengele had already fled to Paraguay and was living on a farm near the Argentine border.

Efforts by Mossad
In May 1960, Isser Harel, director of the Israeli intelligence agency Mossad, personally led the successful effort to capture Adolf Eichmann in Buenos Aires. He was hoping to track down Mengele so that he too could be brought to trial in Israel. Under interrogation, Eichmann provided the address of a boarding house that had been used as a safe house for Nazi fugitives. Surveillance of the house did not reveal Mengele or any members of his family, and the neighborhood postman claimed that although Mengele had recently been receiving letters there under his real name, he had since relocated without leaving a forwarding address. Harel's inquiries at a machine shop where Mengele had been part owner also failed to generate any leads, so he was forced to abandon the search.

Despite having provided Mengele with legal documents using his real name in 1956 (which had enabled him to formalize his permanent residency in Argentina), West Germany was now offering a reward for his capture. Continuing newspaper coverage of his wartime activities, with accompanying photographs, led Mengele to relocate again in 1960. Former pilot Hans-Ulrich Rudel put him in touch with the Nazi supporter Wolfgang Gerhard, who helped Mengele cross the border into Brazil. He stayed with Gerhard on his farm near São Paulo until a more permanent accommodation could be found, which came about with Hungarian expatriates Géza and Gitta Stammer. The couple bought a farm in Nova Europa with the help of an investment from Mengele, who was given the job of managing for them. The three bought a coffee and cattle farm in Serra Negra in 1962, with Mengele owning a half interest. Gerhard had initially told the Stammers that the fugitive's name was "Peter Hochbichler", but they discovered his true identity in 1963. Gerhard persuaded the couple not to report Mengele's location to the authorities by convincing them that they themselves could be implicated for harboring a fugitive. In February 1961, West Germany widened its extradition request to include Brazil, having been tipped off to the possibility that Mengele had relocated there.

Meanwhile, Zvi Aharoni, one of the Mossad agents who had been involved in the Eichmann capture, was placed in charge of a team of agents tasked with tracking down Mengele and bringing him to trial in Israel. Their inquiries in Paraguay revealed no clues to his whereabouts, and they were unable to intercept any correspondence between Mengele and his wife Martha, who by this time was living in Italy. Agents who were following Rudel's movements also failed to produce any leads. Aharoni and his team followed Gerhard to a rural area near São Paulo, where they identified a European man whom they believed to be Mengele. This potential breakthrough was reported to Harel, but the logistics of staging a capture, the budgetary constraints of the search operation, and the priority of focusing on Israel's deteriorating relationship with Egypt led the Mossad chief to call off the manhunt in 1962.

Later life and death
In 1969, Mengele and the Stammers jointly purchased a farmhouse in Caieiras, with Mengele as half owner. When Wolfgang Gerhard returned to Germany in 1971 to seek medical treatment for his ailing wife and son, he gave his identity card to Mengele. The Stammers' friendship with Mengele deteriorated in late 1974, and when they bought a house in São Paulo, he was not invited to join them. The Stammers later bought a bungalow in the Eldorado neighborhood of Diadema, São Paulo, which they rented out to Mengele. Rolf, who had not seen his father since the ski holiday in 1956, visited him at the bungalow in 1977; he found an "unrepentant Nazi" who claimed he had never personally harmed anyone and only carried out his duties as an officer.

Mengele's health had been steadily deteriorating since 1972. He suffered a stroke in 1976, experienced high blood pressure, and developed an ear infection which affected his balance. On 7 February 1979, while visiting his friends Wolfram and Liselotte Bossert in the coastal resort of Bertioga, Mengele suffered another stroke while swimming and drowned. His body was buried in Embu das Artes under the name "Wolfgang Gerhard", whose identification Mengele had been using since 1971. Other aliases used by Mengele in his later life included "Dr. Fausto Rindón" and "S. Josi Alvers Aspiazu".

Exhumation

Meanwhile, sightings of Mengele were being reported all over the world. Wiesenthal claimed to have information that placed Mengele on the Greek island of Kythnos in 1960, in Cairo in 1961, in Spain in 1971, and in Paraguay in 1978, eighteen years after he had left the country. He insisted as late as 1985 that Mengele was still alive—six years after he had died—having previously offered a reward of US$100,000 in 1982 for the fugitive's capture. Worldwide interest in the case was heightened by a mock trial held in Jerusalem in February 1985, featuring the testimonies of over one hundred victims of Mengele's experiments. Shortly afterwards, the West German, Israeli, and U.S. governments launched a coordinated effort to determine Mengele's whereabouts. The West German and Israeli governments offered rewards for his capture, as did The Washington Times and the Simon Wiesenthal Center.

On 31 May 1985, acting on intelligence received by the West German prosecutor's office, police raided the house of Hans Sedlmeier, a lifelong friend of Mengele and sales manager of the family firm in Günzburg. They found a coded address book and copies of letters sent to and received from Mengele. Among the papers was a letter from Wolfram Bossert notifying Sedlmeier of Mengele's death. German authorities alerted the police in São Paulo, who then contacted the Bosserts. Under interrogation, they revealed the location of Mengele's grave and the remains were exhumed on 6 June 1985. Extensive forensic examination indicated with a high degree of probability that the body was indeed that of Josef Mengele. Rolf Mengele issued a statement on 10 June confirming that the body was his father's and that news of his father's death had been concealed to protect people who had sheltered him.

In 1992, DNA testing confirmed Mengele's identity beyond doubt, but family members refused repeated requests by Brazilian officials to repatriate the remains to Germany. The skeleton is stored at the São Paulo Institute for Forensic Medicine, where it is used as an educational aid during forensic medicine courses at the University of São Paulo's medical school.

Later developments

In 2007, the United States Holocaust Memorial Museum received as a donation the Höcker Album, an album of photographs of Auschwitz staff taken by Karl-Friedrich Höcker. Eight of the photographs include Mengele.

In February 2010, a 180-page volume of Mengele's diary was sold by Alexander Autographs at auction for an undisclosed sum to the grandson of a Holocaust survivor. The unidentified previous owner, who acquired the journals in Brazil, was reported to be close to the Mengele family. A Holocaust survivors' organization described the sale as "a cynical act of exploitation aimed at profiting from the writings of one of the most heinous Nazi criminals". Rabbi Marvin Hier of the Simon Wiesenthal Center was glad to see the diary fall into Jewish hands. "At a time when Ahmadinejad's Iran regularly denies the Holocaust and anti-Semitism and hatred of Jews is back in vogue, this acquisition is especially significant", he said. In 2011, a further 31 volumes of Mengele's diaries were sold—again amidst protests—by the same auction house to an undisclosed collector of World War II memorabilia for US$245,000.

Publications
 Racial-Morphological Examinations of the Anterior Portion of the Lower Jaw in Four Racial Groups. This dissertation, completed in 1935 and first published in 1937, earned him a PhD in anthropology from Munich University. In this work Mengele sought to demonstrate that there were structural differences in the lower jaws of individuals from different ethnic groups, and that racial distinctions could be made based on these differences.
 Genealogical Studies in the Cases of Cleft Lip-Jaw-Palate (1938), his medical dissertation, earned him a doctorate in medicine from Frankfurt University. Studying the influence of genetics as a factor in the occurrence of this deformity, Mengele conducted research on families who exhibited these traits in multiple generations. The work also included notes on other abnormalities found in these family lines.
 Hereditary Transmission of Fistulae Auris. Mengele noted that individuals who have this trait also tend to have a dimple on their chin.

See also

 Angel of Death (Slayer song)
 Aribert Heim
 Carl Clauberg
 Eva Mozes Kor
 Grigory Mairanovsky
 Hans Münch
 Kurt Blome
 Nazi eugenics
 Shirō Ishii
 The Boys from Brazil (novel)

References

Informational notes

Citations

Bibliography

Further reading

External links

 
 
 
 
 

1911 births
1979 deaths
20th-century anthropologists
20th-century German non-fiction writers
Accidental deaths in Brazil
Auschwitz concentration camp medical personnel
Burials in São Paulo (state)
Combat medics
Deaths by drowning
Fugitives
Fugitives wanted by Germany
German anthropologists
German eugenicists
German expatriates in Argentina
German expatriates in Brazil
German expatriates in Italy
German male non-fiction writers
German medical writers
German military doctors
Holocaust perpetrators in Poland
Romani genocide perpetrators
Ludwig Maximilian University of Munich alumni
Nazi human subject research
Nazis in South America
People associated with the Kaiser Wilhelm Institute of Anthropology, Human Heredity, and Eugenics
People from Günzburg
People from the Kingdom of Bavaria
People who died at sea
Physicians in the Nazi Party
Recipients of the Iron Cross (1939), 1st class
Recipients of the War Merit Cross
SS-Hauptsturmführer
Waffen-SS personnel
Gross-Rosen concentration camp personnel
Goethe University Frankfurt alumni